Sigmundur Már Herbertsson (born 1 August 1968) is an Icelandic basketball referee and former player. He has been named the Icelandic Referee of the Year fourteen times. He was a FIBA referee from 2004 to 2018 and officiated a total of 233 international games during his career.

Playing career
Sigmundur came up through the junior ranks of Njarðvík. He played for the senior team for a short while, including in the FIBA European Cup Winners' Cup. He also played for Víðir Garði, Reynir Sandgerði og Ungtemplarafélagið Hrönn during his career.

On 6 December 1990, he scored 32 points for Njarðvík-b in a 93–77 victory against Skallagrímur in the Icelandic Cup. On 12 March 1995, he scored 43 points, including 12 three pointers, for Víðir Garði in a 122–48 against Grótta.

Officiating career
Sigmundur started officiating in 1994. He first officiated in the Icelandic top-tier Úrvalsdeild karla in 1995 when he was called in as a replacement referee for a game between Keflavík and Valur.

He became a FIBA referee in 2004. In 2015 he became the first Icelandic referee to officiated at EuroBasket.

On 12 October 2018, he was part of the oldest referee trio in Úrvalsdeild karla history when he officiated a game between Keflavík and KR along with Leifur Garðarsson and Rögnvaldur Már Hreiðarsson.

On 6 May 2021, he became the second Icelandic referee, after Rögnvaldur Már, to officiate 2,000 games in the Icelandic basketball tournament. On  18 November 2021, he broke Rögnaldur's all-time record when he officiated his 2,054 game in the Icelandic basketball tournament.

Awards
Icelandic Basketball Referee of the Year (13)
2005, 2006, 2007, 2008, 2009, 2010, 2011, 2013, 2015, 2016, 2017, 2018, 2019, 2021
Source

References

External links
Úrvalsdeild statistics at kki.is

1968 births
Living people
FIBA referees
Sigmundur Mar Herbertsson
Sigmundur Mar Herbertsson
Sigmundur Mar Herbertsson
Sigmundur Mar Herbertsson